The Clay County Courthouse in Celina, Tennessee is a historic courthouse built in 1873.  It was listed on the National Register of Historic Places in 1977.

It is the first county courthouse ever serving Clay County.  It is located on State Route 52. It is a two-story brick building with brick laid in common bond.

References

Courthouses in Tennessee
National Register of Historic Places in Clay County, Tennessee
Government buildings completed in 1873